Qaranqu (also Romanized as Qaranqū; also known as Gharanghoo, Karangi, Qarāngū, Qarānkū, and Qarengi) is a village in Baba Jik Rural District of the Central District of Chaldoran County, West Azerbaijan province, Iran. At the 2006 National Census, its population was 538 in 103 households. The following census in 2011 counted 412 people in 135 households. The latest census in 2016 showed a population of 473 people in 153 households; it was the largest village in its rural district.

References 

Chaldoran County

Populated places in West Azerbaijan Province

Populated places in Chaldoran County